Guy Evéquoz (born 20 April 1952) is a Swiss fencer. He won a silver medal in the team épée event at the 1972 Summer Olympics.

References

External links
 

1952 births
Living people
Swiss male épée fencers
Olympic fencers of Switzerland
Fencers at the 1972 Summer Olympics
Olympic silver medalists for Switzerland
Olympic medalists in fencing
Medalists at the 1972 Summer Olympics
20th-century Swiss people
21st-century Swiss people